Colin Thomas Hall (born 2 February 1948) is an English former professional footballer who played as a right winger.

Career
Born in Wolverhampton, Hall began his career as a trainee with Nottingham Forest, turning professional in 1966, and making his senior debut a year later. He also played for Bradford City, Bristol City and Hereford United, making a total of 108 appearances in the Football League. He later played non-League football for Bath City.

References

External links
Post War English & Scottish Football League A - Z Player's Transfer Database

1948 births
Living people
English footballers
Nottingham Forest F.C. players
Bradford City A.F.C. players
Bristol City F.C. players
Gloucester City A.F.C. players
Hereford United F.C. players
Bath City F.C. players
Chelmsford City F.C. players
English Football League players
Association football midfielders